Edward Ray Robinson (July 24, 1893 – April 27, 1979) was an American set decorator. He was nominated in 1942 for an Academy Award in the category Best Art Direction for the film The Spoilers.

Selected filmography
 The Spoilers (1942)
 Son of Dracula (1943)
 Patrick the Great (1945)
 Swell Guy (1946)
 The Lovable Cheat (1949)
 Kansas City Confidential (1952)

References

External links

1893 births
1979 deaths
American set decorators
People from Los Angeles